The Sri Lankan cricket team was touring Pakistan in January and February 2009. The series was the first Test tour of Pakistan since South Africa visited in October 2007. The tour was arranged as a replacement for the scheduled tour of India which was cancelled by BCCI following 2008 Mumbai attacks. The tour included 3 ODIs and 2 Tests.

The safety of touring cricket teams in Pakistan had long been in issue.  In May 2002, New Zealand abandoned their Test series in Pakistan after a suicide bomb attack outside their hotel: they have not returned to the country since. Australia had recently refused to tour on safety grounds. In order to persuade the Sri Lankan team to visit, the Pakistan government offered to arrange "presidential-style security.", which they failed to provide, during the Second Test at Lahore, the Sri Lankan team were attacked by masked gunmen in a terror attack. Six members of the teams' security detail and two other civilians were killed. No cricketers were killed but five were listed as injured including Mahela Jayawardene, the Sri Lankan captain, and his deputy Kumar Sangakkara, Ajantha Mendis, Thilan Samaraweera and Tharanga Paranavitana.

This was the final tour of a visiting team in Pakistan until Zimbabwe toured in 2015.

ODI series

1st ODI

2nd ODI

3rd ODI

Test series

1st Test

2nd Test

Only Tour Match:Pakistan Cricket Board Patron's XI vs Sri Lankans

References

External links

2009 in Pakistani cricket
2009 in Sri Lankan cricket
International cricket competitions in 2008–09
Pakistani cricket seasons from 2000–01
2008-09
Cricket tours abandoned due to terrorism